Sakora is a town in the Tiéfora Department of Comoé Province in southwestern Burkina Faso. The town has a population of 1,869.

References

Populated places in the Cascades Region
Comoé Province

Sakora in Ghana refers to a clean shaved head or a bald person. It is used in reference to hairless parts of the body. Sakora may also be used in reference to cleared spaces such as land, table, room, etc.